Macrocytic may refer to:
 macrocytosis
 macrocytic anemia